Pittem is a municipality located in the Belgian province of West Flanders. The municipality comprises the towns of Egem and Pittem proper. Pittem has a population of more than 6,700. The total area is 34.42 km² which gives a population density of 192 inhabitants per km².

Notable people
Rodolphe Poma (1884–1954), Olympic rower
Ferdinand Verbiest (1623–1688), scientist and missionary

References

External links

 Official website  - Available only in Dutch
 Sister City (since 1984) with Shawnee, Kansas

Municipalities of West Flanders